North Dakota State University (NDSU, formally North Dakota State University of Agriculture and Applied Sciences) is a public land-grant research university in Fargo, North Dakota. It was founded as North Dakota Agricultural College in 1890 as the state's land-grant university. As of 2021, NDSU offers 94 undergraduate majors, 146 undergraduate degree programs, 5 undergraduate certificate programs, 84 undergraduate minors, 87 master's degree programs, 51 doctoral degree programs of study, and 210 graduate certificate programs. It is classified among "R1-Doctoral Universities – Very High Research Activity".

NDSU is part of the North Dakota University System. The university also operates North Dakota's agricultural research extension centers distributed across the state on 18,488 acres (75 km2). In 2015, NDSU's economic impact on the state and region was estimated to be $1.3 billion a year according to the NDUS Systemwide Economic Study by the School of Economics at North Dakota State University. In 2016, it was also the fifth-largest employer in the state of North Dakota.

History

Founding
The bill founding North Dakota Agricultural College (NDAC) was signed on March 8, 1890, one year after North Dakota became a state and seven years after initial plans to start an agricultural college in the northern portion of the Dakota Territory. NDAC was established as North Dakota's land-grant institution.

On October 15, 1890, Horace E. Stockbridge became the first NDAC president and the Board of Trustees was formed. Classes were initially held in six classrooms rented from Fargo College.  A provisional course was held on January 6, 1891, and the first regular class of students was admitted on September 8, 1891.  College Hall (Old Main), completed in 1892, was the first building and consisted of offices, classrooms, and a library.

20th century
In 1908, the school's alma mater "The Yellow and The Green" was written and a year later the school's official colors, Yellow and Green, were selected.  In 2015 a change was made where only the first verse of the alma mater is recognized by the university.

NDAC continued to grow and was renamed North Dakota State University on November 8, 1960, after a statewide referendum. The name change was to reflect the increasing field of study breadth of the institution.

A  area including 12 historic buildings was listed on the National Register of Historic Places as North Dakota State University District in 1986.

21st century
Around the start of the 21st century, NDSU began a phase of growth.

NDSU surpassed 10,000 students in the fall of 2000 for the first time, and by Fall Semester of 2009, NDSU increased enrollment by another 10% to 14,189 students. Enrollment in 2018 stood at 13,650.

Research, athletic programs, and campus facilities benefited from increases in student enrollment.  Between 2000 and 2007, NDSU added a number of undergraduate programs and 31 graduate programs. Several buildings have been built or expanded and remodeled over the past seven years, including the Wallman Wellness Center, Memorial Union, and the College of Business.

In 2004, all athletic programs moved to Division I.

Campuses

North Dakota State University is primarily located in Fargo, North Dakota. NDSU consists of several campuses including: the main campus, NDSU Downtown, and several agricultural research extension centers.

Main campus
The appearance of the main campus is maintained by the university's extensive agricultural programs. The main campus boundaries are 19th Avenue N. to the north, University Drive to the east, 18th St. N. to the west, and 12th Avenue N. to the south.

Located in the historic Minard–South Engineering quad is the Babbling Brook. The Babbling Brook is a large water feature that offers students a serene location to relax and study. Enhancing the area are trickling waterfalls, various fish and flowers, an amphitheater seating area, and "buffalo-rubbed" rocks. This area offers a space for outdoor class sessions and small performances.

Over the years, NDSU's main campus has been aesthetically enhanced with many monuments including: the Bjornson Memorial Obelisk, Theatre Passion: Mask Sculpture, We Will Never Forget Memorial, and Noble's Golden Marguerite, among many others.

Southern area
The southern area of the campus consists of many of NDSU's historic buildings, including Old Main, Minard Hall, Ceres Hall, Putnam Hall, South Engineering, and Morrill Hall. There is also a statue of a bison, the school's mascot, which is a very popular place for photographs.

Central area
The central area consists of the Engineering Complex, Shepperd Arena, and many academic buildings, and the Quentin Burdick Building (QBB formerly IACC) which is a technology powerhouse for the entire state. The QBB contains several hundred computers and computer servers for many of the universities in the North Dakota University System as well as many other technologies and communication devices.

The NDSU Memorial Union is also situated within the central campus and serves student social needs, as well as several large rooms available for presentations and functions.

In the fall of 2014, NDSU began construction on the Science, Technology, Engineering, and Mathematics (STEM) building. Since then the building has been completed and renamed to A. Glenn Hill Center.

North area
Just north of the central area of campus is a large section that consists of many academic buildings, residence halls, and dining centers. This part is easily recognizable as four residential high-rises tower above the landscape. They are surrounded by grassy quads, as well as sand-volleyball and basketball courts. Between the four identical high-rises a dining center serves their 1,000+ residents. Tunnels connect to the towers to ease travel in bad weather. A large new upper-class student residence, known as the Living Learning Center (East and West), is to the west of the high-rises. To the east, another dining center serves other nearby residence halls and their 1,000+ residents.

West area
This area of campus is home to the NDSU Wallman Wellness Center, which currently houses the Wellness Center department, Student Health Service and Disability Services. The Wellness Center, which was first completed in 2001, expanded in 2007 and added an aquatic addition in 2016.

Athletic area
Further north is an area of campus that consists of many athletic facilities including the Bentson Bunker Fieldhouse, Bison Sports Arena, Fargodome, Newman Outdoor Field, Ellig Sports Complex, McCormick Wrestling Complex, Dacotah Field, Schlanser Track, and others.

A $31.6 million renovation of Bison Sports Arena (commonly referred to as the BSA) has been completed. Upon completion, the Sanford Health Athletic Complex now includes the Scheels Center basketball arena; a  basketball training facility; a  performance training center; a  Hall of Fame display, and a Bison team store. Construction for the Shelly Ellig Indoor Track and Field Facility started in October 2011.

NDSU juadded a new aquatics center inside the Wellness Center. It opened in the fall of 2016, and has many advantages. Including a wet classroom, a lap pool, a relaxing pool, workout classes, and much more.

Research and technology park
The Research and Technology Park is a  site of innovation and technology, residing to the west of the north area of campus, and consists of entities that research and develop nano technologies, RFID, polymers and coatings, high performance computing, and others.

The Technology Incubator opened in March 2007. The  facility is located in the NDSU Research and Technology Park, five minutes from the international airport and major interstate highways. The Technology Incubator was developed to assist startup entities and to complement the Research and Technology Park.

The Research and Technology Park also houses the Fargo branch of the North Dakota State College of Science (NDSCS-Fargo), which opened in 1997.

NDSU is classified among "R1: Doctoral Universities – Very high research activity".

NDSU Downtown

NDSU owns several buildings in downtown Fargo, N.D. Approximately 4,000 students, faculty, and staff use these NDSU Downtown facilities each year.

The project started in 2004 with the purchase and renovation of the former Northern School Supply building, located at NP Avenue and 8th Street North in the city's downtown. The structure, now known as Renaissance Hall, houses NDSU's visual arts department, architecture department and the office of Tri-College University, a partnership between NDSU, Concordia College and Minnesota State University Moorhead. The building's features include studios, classrooms, a wood shop, computer laboratories, gallery and an outdoor sculpture area.

In 2006, the NDSU Development Foundation purchased the Pioneer Mutual Life Insurance Building and Lincoln Mutual Life & Casualty Insurance Building along 2nd Avenue North between 8th and 10th Streets, also in downtown Fargo. The refurbished Pioneer building is now Richard H. Barry Hall, named after a former Fargo businessman. Barry Hall is home to the NDSU College of Business and Department of Agribusiness and Applied Economics. According to the college, the downtown location and addition of the North Dakota Trade Office have increased interaction with local businesses and allowed the college to expand its offerings, such as a Certificate in Entrepreneurship in partnership with the University of North Dakota, and add three new centers: The Center for Professional Selling and Sales Technology, Fraud Education and Research Institute and the Center for Leadership Practice. Barry Hall has 12 conference rooms, a two-story atrium, 14 classrooms, a 250-seat auditorium and a six-story faculty office town.

The Lincoln Mutual Life and Casualty building is now Klai Hall, named for NDSU alumnus and university supporter John Klai. The building houses the landscape architecture program and features studios, classrooms, a model shop, computer lab, laser cutter facilities and a library.

For travel between NDSU Downtown and the main campus, MATBUS operates various circulator routes that all NDSU students can ride for free using their student ID.

Agricultural research extension centers
North Dakota State University has many research extension centers across the state that encompass over 18,488 acres (75 km2) in total. Major NDSU research extension centers are located near Carrington, Casselton, Dickinson, Fargo, Hettinger, Langdon, Minot, Streeter, and Williston.

Academics
North Dakota State University is divided into the following colleges:
 Arts and Sciences
 Engineering
 Health Professions and Human Sciences
 Business
 Agriculture, Food Systems & Natural Resources

NDSU offers a major known as University Studies that allows a student to study in nearly any area that interests them. To enhance learning among its students, NDSU offers online classes, online academic portals, or technology enhanced classrooms.

NDSU uses a semester system – Fall and Spring with two summer sessions. The majority of students are full-time with 55% male and 45% female.

Admissions
For 2022, 91.6% of applicants were admitted to NDSU with admitted students having an average GPA of 3.47. Admission is test-optional, NDSU neither requiring ACT nor SAT test scores for admission; however, for those applicants submitting scores, the average SAT score was 1170 and average ACT score was 24.

Rankings

 In several National Science Foundation research subcategories for Fiscal Year 2012, NDSU's research expenditures rank in the top 100 in several areas, including expenditures for agricultural sciences, social sciences, physical sciences, chemistry, and psychology.
 As an engineering school, NDSU ranks among the top 10% of all engineering programs in the US (#171 out of 1723).
 With more than $155 million in research expenditures in FY 2020 alone, in Fiscal Year 2013 NDSU ranked 97 among 415 public universities by the National Science Foundation’s Higher Education Research and Development Survey (HERD).
 U.S. News & World Report ranked NDSU as tied at #403 in Top Performers on Social Mobility in 2023. 

In 2009, Forbes.com listed Fargo as No. 5 in an article called "Top College Towns for Jobs." The article suggested that research universities are conducive to great environments for business, providing an educated labor force and centers of innovation stemming from university research.

Libraries
Total collections at the NDSU libraries include holdings of approximately 1 million physical items in addition to access to extensive electronic resources.  The NDSU library was remodeled and updated during the school year of 2015 and 2016.

NDSU libraries:
 Main Library – contains over 500,000 items including books, periodicals, government documents, maps, media, and microforms
 Heritage Collection – contains 13,000 manuscripts, artifacts and other primary materials
 Klai Juba Wald Architectural Studies Library – contains over 20,000 physical items
 Business Learning Center – supports the College of Business and Department of Agribusiness and Applied Economics and contains over 4,000 physical items
 P.N. Haakenson Health Sciences Library – contains 8,000 physical items
 Institute for Regional Studies and NDSU Archives – contains over 22,000 manuscripts, artifacts and other historical resources
 Storage Annex – houses over 300,000 physical items

Research

NDSU is a major component of the Red River Valley Research Corridor. According to the NSF Higher Education and Research Development (HERD) survey, NDSU ranks in the top 100 research universities for agricultural sciences and social sciences. According to the National Science Foundation, NDSU is the largest research institution in the state of North Dakota. NDSU's annual research expenditures exceed $150 million. Major fields of research at NDSU include nanotechnology, genomics, agriculture, chemistry, and polymers and coatings. NDSU also has a 55-acre (223,000 m2) Research and Technology Park located on the north side of the main campus.

The Carnegie Commission on Higher Education has classified NDSU in the "Research University/High Research Activity" category.

Athletics

NDSU's sports teams are known as the North Dakota State Bison, or simply The Bison (pronounced "biZon").  They are also known as "The Thundering Herd." NDSU's athletic symbol is a caricature of the American Bison.

North Dakota State's intercollegiate sports teams participate in NCAA Division I in all sports (Division I Championship Subdivision in football). NDSU was a charter member of the Division II North Central Conference (NCC), and made the move to Division I sports in the fall of 2004. NDSU spent the next two years as an independent in Division I in all sports other than football, in which it was a member of the Great West Football Conference. The school was accepted into the Summit League on August 31, 2006, and began play in that conference on July 1, 2007. The football team left the Great West Football Conference and joined the Missouri Valley Football Conference on March 7, 2007. They became a full member of the conference during the 2008 season. NDSU joined the Big 12 Conference in wrestling in 2015.

Football

The Bison football team was the winningest program in NCAA Football history with thirty-three conference championships and eight national championships (1965, 1968, 1969, 1983, 1985, 1986, 1988, 1990) before moving to Division I Championship Subdivision in 2004. In January 2012, NDSU defeated Sam Houston State in the FCS National Championship game becoming the 2011 season National Champions. NDSU football is a major event in the city of Fargo and the region, averaging over 18,000 fans per home game.  The Bison play their home games at the Fargodome (cap. 19,287). In January 2013, NDSU football won the NCAA Division I championship title for a second year in a row, defeating Sam Houston again. They also defeated Kansas State and hosted ESPN College Gameday. In January 2014, NDSU defeated Towson to win its 3rd consecutive national championship in FCS football. It is only the 2nd team in NCAA history to achieve this feat. NDSU also defeated FBS Iowa State for their 6th consecutive win over an FBS opponent and hosted ESPN College Gameday for the 2nd straight season. January 2015, for the 2014 season, NDSU defeated Illinois State to win its 4th consecutive national championship in FCS football. 

In the 2015 season, NDSU defeated Jacksonville State for a record 5th consecutive NCAA Division I FCS national championship. No football team in the modern history of the NCAA has accomplished this feat. In the 2016 season, NDSU was defeated by James Madison, 27–17, who eventually went on to win the championship. This ended the Bison's reign of 5 consecutive championships. The following season the Bison went on to win the FCS National Championship again for the sixth time in seven years, by beating James Madison, 17–13. In 2018, the Bison completed an undefeated season going 15–0 and defeating the Eastern Washington Eagles, 38–24, and winning their 7th FCS championship in 8 years. After defeating James Madison in 2019 for a third straight title, the Bison lost in the 2020-21 FCS quarterfinals in the COVID-impacted spring season to eventual champion Sam Houston State before reclaiming the title in 2021 with a decisive 38-10 victory over Montana State. North Dakota State University has the most NCAA FCS football championships, as of 2021.

On September 17, 2016, the Bison upset the No. 13 Iowa Hawkeyes, 23–21. It was the Bison's sixth-straight win against a team in the NCAA Division I Football Bowl Subdivision.

Basketball

The Bison men's and women's basketball| teams have played since 1970 in a venue that was known before 2016 as the Bison Sports Arena. Following a $41 million renovation that nearly doubled the facility's seating capacity, the venue was renamed the Sanford Health Athletic Complex (commonly known as the SHAC), with the basketball arena called The Scheels Center, beginning with the 2016–2017 season. Both teams play in The Summit League

The women's basketball team won five NCAA National Championships during the 1990s – 1991, 1993 through 1996. In January 2006, the NCAA recognized NDSU's four consecutive Division II Women's Basketball Championships (1993–1996) as one of the "25 Most Defining Moments in NCAA History."

NDSU's men's basketball team gained national recognition in 2006 with an upset win at #13 ranked Wisconsin, and again in the 2006–07 season with a win at #8 ranked Marquette.

On March 10, 2009, North Dakota State gained an automatic invitation to the NCAA basketball tournament in its first year of eligibility for Division I postseason play, by defeating Oakland 66–64 in the Summit League Tournament Championship game. The #14 seeded Bison lost to #3 Kansas in the 1st Round in a game played in Minneapolis, MN.

In the 2nd Round of the 2014 NCAA basketball tournament, the #12 seeded Bison team defeated #5 Oklahoma 80–75 for the program's first NCAA tournament win in Spokane, WA; then it lost to #4 San Diego State in the 3rd Round.

NDSU also made the 2015 NCAA basketball tournament, with the #15 seeded Bison falling 86–76 to #2 seeded Gonzaga in the Round of 64. (Gonzaga went on to the Elite Eight, before losing to Duke, the eventual Tournament Champion.) The Bison last played in the NCAA Tournament in 2019, winning a First Four game against North Carolina Central by a 78-74 score. This advanced the Bison to the opening round bracket where they took on #1 seed Duke, eventually falling 85-62. The 2020 men's team went 25-8 during the season, won the Summit League tournament title, defeating in-state rival North Dakota in the championship game but were not able to compete in the NCAA Tournament, which was cancelled due to the COVID-19 pandemic.

Wrestling

Formed in 1957, Bison wrestling won Division II team titles in 1988, 1998, 2000, and 2001. The team first became fully eligible for the Division I tournament competition in 2009.  In 2015, following the disbanding of the Western Wrestling Conference, the Bison and all other former WWC members joined the Big 12 Conference for wrestling.  NDSU wrestlers compete in the Bison Sports Arena but will be moving into the Sanford Health Athletic complex for the 2016 season.

Other sports
North Dakota State's Bison dance team won a National Championship by taking 1st place at nationals in 2012 and 2013 in pom in Orlando, Florida.

The NDSU Track and Field team has won nine consecutive conference championships in the Summit League.

Amy Olson (née Anderson), a member of the women's golf team, set the NCAA record for most career match victories (20).

Student life

Campus media
Thunder Radio, an NDSU radio station, operates on KNDS-LP 96.3 FM and offers online streaming. The Bison Information Network, founded in 2008, is a student-run TV station. It focuses on student and athletic news, and is broadcast on campus channel 84 and Fargo public-access television cable TV channel 14.

Publications
The Spectrum is NDSU's student newspaper. It has been in print since 1896.

Bison Illustrated is a magazine covering North Dakota State Bison athletics.

NDSU magazine is a magazine for alumni and friends of North Dakota State University. Story ideas and information for NDSU magazine come from a variety of sources. The inaugural issue was October 2000.

"Northern Eclecta" is a literary journal produced by students in NDSU's Literary Publications class. It accepts creative writing, photographs, and artwork from NDSU students and community students in grades 7–12.

Performing arts
The Division of Performing Arts offers four performance facilities:
 Festival Concert Hall – An acoustically tuned 1,000-seat hall, opened in 1982. FCH is the concert home for all NDSU music major ensembles, such as the Gold Star Concert Band and the NDSU Concert Choir, and the Fargo-Moorhead Symphony and Fargo-Moorhead Opera.
 Beckwith Recital Hall – A smaller setting with a seating capacity of 200. It is used as a classroom for art and music as well as faculty, student and small group recitals.
 Askanase Auditorium – A 380-seat proscenium theater. Theatre NDSU uses the theater for a majority of their plays.
 Walsh Studio Theatre – A flexible studio-laboratory black box theater. It is located in Askanase Hall.

NDSU's Gold Star Marching Band performs for Bison football games at the Fargodome.

Residence life
The Department of Residence Life operates 13 residence halls. The department also operates 4 apartment complexes on campus. NDSU requires all first year students to live in an on-campus residence hall.

The Memorial Union 
Construction of the Memorial Union was completed in 1953, and the grand opening held during Homecoming weekend of that same year. The Memorial Union initially had a ballroom and dining center. In 2005, the building underwent a $22 million expansion and remodeling. Today, the Memorial Union consists of three floors. The main floor is home to the NDSU Bookstore, a coffee shop, bank, and various offices. A ballroom and several conference rooms comprise much of the second floor, and the basement is home to a dining center, food court, and various recreation facilities including a bowling alley and e-sports gaming lab.

Dining
There are three dining centers on campus. Two (the Residence Dining Center and the West Dining Center) are located to the north of campus near the majority of the dormitories, and one situated in the Memorial Union. A number of restaurants are located on campus as well, such as Panda Express and the Bison Beanery.

Greek life
Greek life has been a part of the NDSU campus since 1904 when the first social fraternity was formed offering membership to men in all fields of study. The first women's social fraternity was formed on campus in 1908.

Fraternities and sororities have built several historically significant "Fraternity Row" homes along University Ave. N, 12th St. N, and 12th Ave. N, in Fargo.

As of 2020, approximately 1,000 members made up about 7% of the campus population. NDSU presently has 14 national fraternities and sororities, 12 of which are open to individuals in any field of study and 2 that restrict membership to students in specific professional disciplines and/or areas of career interest.

Fraternities

Sororities

Notable alumni

 Humayun Ahmed – Bangladeshi writer and filmmaker 
 Mark Andrews – former U.S. Senator
 Bob Backlund – professional wrestler
 Jeff Bentrim – professional football player
 Rick Berg – former U.S. Congressman
 David Bernauer – former CEO and chairman of Walgreens
 Gus Bradley – professional football coach
 Taylor Braun – professional basketball player
 Tyrone Braxton – professional football player
 Doug Burgum – Governor of North Dakota and founder of Great Plains Software
 Alf Clausen – composer for multiple television programs and motion pictures
 Craig Dahl – professional football player
 Kyle Emanuel – professional football player
 Lamar Gordon – professional football player
 Jean Guy – former First Lady of North Dakota
 William L. Guy – former Governor of North Dakota
 Loren D. Hagen (1946–1971), US Army Special Forces Green Beret and Medal of Honor recipient
 Joe Kittell – college basketball player
 Phil Hansen – professional football player
 Kole Heckendorf – professional football player
 Ralph Herseth – 21st Governor of South Dakota from January 6, 1959, to January 3, 1961
 Ramon Humber – professional football player
 Rob Hunt – professional football player
 Ravindra Khattree – academic statistician
 Trey Lance – professional football player
 Jon Lindgren Mayor of Fargo, North Dakota, 1978–1994, chairman of the economics department at NDSU, and pioneering LGBT rights advocate
 Arthur A. Link – former governor of North Dakota
 Doug Lloyd – professional football player
 Audra Mari – Miss North Dakota USA 2014 and Miss World America 2016
 Joe Mays – professional football player
 Clarence McGeary – professional football player
 Earl Mindell – writer and nutritionist
 Steve Nelson – professional football player
 Amy Olson – professional golfer
 Annette Olson – Miss North Dakota 2006
 Mancur Olson – 20th century economist and social scientist
 Ilhan Omar – DFL Representative, Minnesota's 5th congressional district
 Payton Otterdahl – Olympic shot putteran
 Stacy Robinson – professional football player
 Tyler Roehl – professional football player
 Lilian Imuetinyan Salami – academic and current Vice-Chancellor, University of Benin
 Nick Schommer – professional football player
 Andre Smith – professional basketball player
 Amanda Smock – Olympic triple jumper
 Isaac Snell – professional football player
 Chris Tuchscherer – wrestler and mixed martial artist
 Edward Vance – principal-in-charge of design and CEO at EV&A Architects
 Matt Veldman – professional football player
 Neil Wagner – professional baseball player
 Charles F. Wald – former Deputy Commander of United States European Command
 Carson Wentz – professional football player
 Ben Woodside – professional basketball player
 Milton R. Young – former U.S. Senator

References

External links

 
 North Dakota State Athletics website

 
Public universities and colleges in North Dakota
Land-grant universities and colleges
Education in Fargo–Moorhead
Educational institutions established in 1890
Buildings and structures in Fargo, North Dakota
Education in Cass County, North Dakota
Tourist attractions in Fargo, North Dakota
Fargo, North Dakota
1890 establishments in North Dakota